John Gibbs may refer to:

John Gibbs (architect), English architect
John Gibbs (basketball) (1915–1982), American professional basketball player
John Gibbs (bishop) (1917–2007), Anglican Bishop of Coventry
John Gibbs (British politician) for Hereford
John Gibbs (rugby league) (born 1956), Australian rugby league footballer turned radio broadcaster
John Gibbs (US government official), American commentator and federal government official
John Gibbs (Virginia politician) (died 1622), American settler from England
John L. Gibbs (1838–1908), Lt. Governor of Minnesota
John Dixon Gibbs (1834–1912), British engineer and financier

See also

Gibbs (surname)
John Gibbs Gilbert (1810–1889), real name John Gibbs, comedian
John Gibbes

John Gibbs House (disambiguation)
Jonathan Gibbs (disambiguation)
John Gibb (disambiguation) 
John (disambiguation) 
Gibbs (disambiguation)